Greatest Hits: Chapter One may refer to:

 The Hits – Chapter One, released as Greatest Hits: Chapter One internationally, the first greatest hits album by the Backstreet Boys
 Greatest Hits – Chapter One (Kelly Clarkson album), the first greatest hits album by Kelly Clarkson

See also
 Chapter One: Greatest Hits, a greatest hits compilation album released in 2002 by rapper Jay-Z